Stoltman is a surname. Notable people with this surname include:

 James B. Stoltman (1935–2019), American archaeologist
 Lech Stoltman, Polish Paralympic athlete
 Luke Stoltman (born 1984), Scottish strongman competitor
 Tom Stoltman (born 1994), Scottish strongman competitor